The 2016 Nuclear Security Summit was a summit held in Washington, D.C., United States on March 31 and April 1, 2016. It was the fourth edition of the conference, succeeding the 2014 Nuclear Security Summit.

Background

The 2016 Nuclear Security Summit was held at the Walter E. Washington Convention Center in Washington, D.C. in the United States of America.

Participants

Notably absent from the summit were leaders or representatives of Russia, North Korea, Iran and Belarus. However, a significant contingent of Asian leaders especially from South Asia such as India and Singapore attending the summit was a probable sign of continental concern over terrorist threats alongside vulnerable nuclear facilities.

Announcements

Various countries, including Kazakhstan and Poland, undertook to reduce their highly enriched uranium stockpiles. Japan agreed to ship additional separated plutonium to the U.S. Canada pledged $42 million to bolster nuclear security. The U.S. disclosed its own inventory of highly enriched uranium has dropped from 741 metric tons in the 1990s to 586 metric tons as of 2013. A strengthened nuclear security agreement, which had languished since 2005, was finally approved, extending safeguards for nuclear materials and requiring criminal penalties for nuclear smuggling. According to the U.S., since the last summit in 2014, ten nations have removed or disposed of about 450 kilograms of highly enriched uranium; Argentina, Switzerland and Uzbekistan are now free of highly enriched uranium, as is all of Latin America and the Caribbean.

The summit participants stated that the 2016 summit would be "the last of this kind".

Three months after the meeting, NPCIL and Westinghouse agreed to conclude contractual arrangements for 6 reactors by June 2017.

See also
Southeast Asian Nuclear-Weapon-Free Zone Treaty
Nuclear disarmament

References

External links

2016 conferences
2016 in international relations
21st-century diplomatic conferences (Security)
Diplomatic conferences in the United States
Nuclear proliferation
Nuclear weapons policy
2016 in Washington, D.C.
March 2016 events in the United States
April 2016 events in the United States